Polypoetes crenulata is a moth of the family Notodontidae. It is found in western Ecuador.

The length of the forewings is 12–13 mm for males. The ground color of the forewings os dark gray-brown to blackish gray, without contrasting markings. The ground color of the hindwings is dark charcoal gray to black, slightly darker than the forewings.

Etymology
The species name is derived from the Latin word crenulatus (meaning minutely notched) and refers to the heavily scalloped posterior margin of male.

References

Moths described in 2008
Notodontidae of South America